A by-election was held on 24 July 1941 for the British House of Commons parliamentary constituency of Pontefract in Yorkshire.  The seat had become vacant on the death of the Labour Member of Parliament Adam Hills, who had held the seat since the 1935 general election.

The Labour candidate, Percy Barstow, was returned unopposed.

See also
Pontefract (UK Parliament constituency)
1919 Pontefract by-election
1962 Pontefract by-election
List of United Kingdom by-elections

References

By-elections to the Parliament of the United Kingdom in West Yorkshire constituencies
Unopposed by-elections to the Parliament of the United Kingdom in English constituencies
1941 in England
1941 elections in the United Kingdom
Elections in Wakefield
Pontefract
1940s in Yorkshire